Katherine Mary Razzall (born 31 October 1970) is a British journalist and television newsreader.

Early life and education
Razzall was born in Wandsworth, London, daughter of the British Liberal Democrat politician and parliamentarian Lord Razzall and his first wife, Elizabeth Christina (née Wilkinson). She was educated at the University of Oxford where she studied philosophy and modern languages at Pembroke College, Oxford.

Career
Razzall started her career on an ITN traineeship before working for Channel 4 News as a reporter.
After 15 years at Channel 4, Newsnight hired Razzall as a special correspondent in 2014. In May 2019, Newsnight promoted Razzall to UK editor. She presented Newsnight while standing in for the programme's main host Emily Maitlis in May 2020 during the scandal over Dominic Cummings. On 29 July 2021, it was announced that in November she would take the place of BBC News' arts editor Will Gompertz in the new role of its culture editor.

Personal life
Razzall has been married to the actor Oliver Milburn since 18 December 2004. The couple were honeymooning in Sri Lanka when the 2004 Indian Ocean earthquake and tsunami struck. They have a daughter. Previously, Razzall dated Milburn's friend, the actor Damian Lewis.

Razzall featured on the song "The 2nd Law: Unsustainable" by English rock band Muse, reading out words written by the lead singer, guitarist and lyricist Matt Bellamy.

References

External links

1970 births
British journalists
Living people
Alumni of Pembroke College, Oxford
Razzall family
People from Wandsworth
Daughters of life peers